Terrance Brian O'Brien (7 November 1918 – 7 October 2011) was an Australian rules footballer who played with St Kilda in the Victorian Football League (VFL).

O'Brien later served in the Royal Australian Air Force during the latter part of World War II.

Notes

External links 

1918 births
2011 deaths
Australian rules footballers from Melbourne
St Kilda Football Club players
Sandringham Football Club players
People from Mordialloc, Victoria
Royal Australian Air Force personnel of World War II
Military personnel from Melbourne